The Ford Indy V8 engine is a naturally-aspirated, pushrod, V-8, Indy car racing engine, initially specially designed by Ford for use by Team Lotus (but later used by other teams as well), to compete in the Indianapolis 500; from 1963 to 1967. This is the engine that gave Jim Clark the victory in 1965 with his Lotus 38 chassis, Graham Hill victory in 1966 with his Lola T90 chassis, and A. J. Foyt the win at Indianapolis in 1967, in his Coyote 67 chassis. 

A smaller Garrett turbocharged  engine was introduced in 1968, and gave Mario Andretti the win in his Brawner Hawk chassis at the 1969 Indianapolis 500. This engine was used throughout the 1969 and 1970 seasons, until 1971 (their last season), after which Ford pulled-out and withdrew from the series for 1972. They would not return to Indy car racing until 1976, with the Ford-sponsored Cosworth DFX engine.

Background/History 

IndyCars with Ford engines first competed in 1935 using a production-based Ford V8 in the Miller-Ford racer. A pushrod Ford V8 raced with Lotus in 1963, and Ford's first Indy win was in 1965 with a DOHC V8.

Lotus 64 engine 
Because the previous 56 had a gas turbine engine, Lotus decided to build a new engine for the 1969 Indianapolis 500. The project was funded by Ford who supplied a V8 turbo engine, and by STP. The biggest difference was the new engine; a 2.65-liter turbocharged Ford engine, making more than 700 horsepower.

Ford 406 engine 

The Ford 406 was a  Formula One engine, and was essentially a downsized variant of the Ford Indy V8 engine. It was used in the McLaren M2B Formula One car in 1966, prior to the introduction of the highly successful Ford-Cosworth DFV engine in 1967.

A.J. Foyt engine 
With Ford Motor Company pulling out of Indy car racing after ten years of competitive domination, A. J. Foyt obtained the rights to Ford's DOHC Indy engine, and it was rebadged as a Foyt. A.J. himself managed to win the 1977 race in his Coyote chassis with a  Foyt-badged engine.

Applications
Brawner Hawk
Coyote 67
Coyote 68
Coyote/Kuzma
Coyote 70
Coyote 71
Lola T80
Lola T90/T92
Lola T150/T153
Lola T270/T272
Lotus 29
Lotus 34
Lotus 38
Lotus 42
Lotus 64
McNamara T-500
McNamara T-501

References

Engines by model
Ford engines
IndyCar Series
V8 engines
Gasoline engines by model